is a Japanese footballer currently playing as a right back for FC Osaka.

Career 

In 2019, Yoshinare begin first career with Cerezo Osaka U-23 due to campaign J3 League for 2019 season.

In 2021, Yoshinare signed first professional contract with J1 club, Cerezo Osaka. On 18 January 2021, he was loaned out to J3 club, Kamatamare Sanuki for a season.

On 17 January 2022, Yoshinare loaned again to JFL club, FC Osaka for 2022 season. On 20 November at same year, he brought his club promotion to J3 League for the first time in history. On 20 December at same year, Yoshinare agreement permanently transfer to FC Osaka for upcoming 2023 season.

Career statistics

Club 
.

Notes

References

External links

2001 births
Living people
Sportspeople from Osaka Prefecture
Association football people from Osaka Prefecture
Japanese footballers
Association football midfielders
J1 League players
J3 League players
Japan Football League players
Cerezo Osaka U-23 players
Cerezo Osaka players
Kamatamare Sanuki players
FC Osaka players